{{DISPLAYTITLE:C19H25NO3}}
The molecular formula C19H25NO3 (molar mass: 315.41 g/mol, exact mass: 315.1834 u) may refer to:

 25D-NBOMe, or NBOMe-2C-D
 Mitiglinide

Molecular formulas